Buenavista is an unincorporated community in Indian Creek Township, Monroe County, in the U.S. state of Indiana.

History
Buenavista was platted in 1849. A post office was established at Buenavista in 1873, and remained in operation until it was discontinued in 1925.

Geography

References

Unincorporated communities in Monroe County, Indiana
Unincorporated communities in Indiana
Bloomington metropolitan area, Indiana